Dendrobium baileyi, commonly known as the blotched gemini orchid, is an epiphytic or lithophytic orchid in the family Orchidaceae and has arching stems and flowering stems with one or two spidery, yellow flowers with dark purple spots emerging from leaf axis. It grows in tropical North Queensland, New Guinea and the Solomon Islands.

Description 
The leaves are dark green and narrow lance-shaped to narrow egg-shaped. The flowers are resupinate, spider-like and yellowish green with many dark purple spots and blotches. The side lobes are reddish and triangular and the middle lobe has a hairy white ridge near its base. Flowering occurs from January to February.

Taxonomy and naming
Dendrobium baileyi was first formally described in 1874 by Ferdinand von Mueller from a specimen on a forested hillside near Rockingham Bay and the description was published in the Fragmenta phytographiae Australiae. The specific epithet (baileyi) honours Frederick Bailey.

Distribution and habitat
The blotched gemini orchid grows on trees in rainforest between the McIlwraith Range and Townsville in Queensland and in New Guinea and the Solomon Islands.

References 

baileyi
Orchids of Queensland
Epiphytic orchids
Plants described in 1874